The Most Excellent Order of the Pearl of Africa is the highest civilian award of the Ugandan honours system and is awarded to heads of state and government leaders.

History
The award was instituted in 2001 with the National Honours and Awards Act, 2001 along with other awards.

Recipients

References

External links
Ugandan Presidential Awards website
Photograph of the award ceremony at Haki Ngowi Blog

Orders, decorations, and medals of Uganda
Awards established in 2005
2005 establishments in Uganda